Countries have cultivated coffee beans into various vehicles to satisfy needs unique to each country. Whether it be for energy, socialization, or tradition, the cultivation of coffee has served as a motivating force of the world. The modernization of coffee and its unique forms across cultures are markers of tradition and modern changes across continents. Coffee culture appears in the way in which people consume coffee, the way they make it, and where coffee is served and shared. Each of these factors combined reflects the lives of the people in these countries and the importance of coffee across the world.

History

Origins

Ethiopian Legend 
The heritage of coffee grown all around the world can be found in the forests of Ethiopia, where the theory of its origins also resides. According to local legend, a goat herder named Kaldi saw his goats eating coffee "berries". This caused them to gain extreme amounts of energy, preventing them from sleeping at night. He brought this information to local monks, who created a drink with the coffee beans. One monk who drank the concoction found that it allowed him to stay up all night and pray. As this information spread to other Ethiopian monks, it began to spread across the civilized world.

Cultivation 
Much of the popularization of coffee is due to its cultivation in the Arab world, beginning in what is now Yemen, by Sufi monks in the 15th century. Through thousands of Muslims pilgrimaging to Mecca, the enjoyment and harvesting of coffee, or the "wine of Araby" spread to other countries (e.g. Turkey, Egypt, Syria) and eventually to a majority of the world through the 16th century. Coffee, in addition to being essential in the home, became a major part of social life. Coffeehouses, qahwa قَهوة in Modern Standard Arabic, became "Schools of the Wise" as they developed into places of intellectual discussion, in addition to centers of relaxation and comradery.

Expansion

Europe 
By the 17th century, European travelers had brought coffee to the continent, where large amounts of controversy surrounded it as its popularity grew. The "Schools of the Wise" of the Arab world began spreading across the continent, becoming known as "penny universities" in England, and developed to satisfy the needs of various social classes. In addition, coffee replaced beer and wine as the "breakfast drink", improving the quality produced by the working classes. Once Pope Clement VIII gave a papal pardon to coffee in 1615, it increased the coffee consuming population and contributed to its eventual expansion to the Americas.

The Americas 
Traders, conquistadors, and missionaries brought coffee over to the Americas with them during the Columbian Exchange. In terms of North America, the British brought coffee over to New York, then New Amsterdam, in the 1600s. It reached peak popularity after the Boston Tea Party, and has remained an American staple drink ever since. The parent seed of the Arabica coffee found mainly in the Caribbean, but also in other countries in South and Central America, was brought over in 1723. After the Mayor of Amsterdam gifted King Louis XIV a coffee plant in 1714, naval officer Gabriel de Clieu stole a seed and brought it to the island of Martinique. Its cultivation eventually spread across the aforementioned regions. Brazil, today's largest producer of coffee, was brought coffee by Francisco de Mello Palheta, who got the seeds from French Guinea.

Slavery 
Today's high-grossing industry of coffee was built by the institution of slavery across the world. Once the demand for coffee grew past the amount being produced in the Arabic world, the Dutch began cultivating coffee in Indonesia, modern-day Java, and eventually moved to Sumatra and Celebes in the 17th century. Much of the coffee grown in Africa and the Americas was grown and harvested by slaves as well.

World cultures

Coffeehouse culture 

Coffeehouse culture began in the Arab world, and eventually spread to other areas of the world and blended with the local culture. Traditional Arab coffeehouses are places where mostly men meet to socialize over games, coffee, and water pipes ( or ). Depending on where the coffeehouse is, its specialty differs. In North Africa, green tea is served with mint or coffee is served European style. Arabic coffee, or Turkish coffee, is made in Egypt and the Levant countries. Arabic coffee is a very small amount of dark coffee boiled in a pot and presented in a demitasse cup. Particularly in Egypt, coffee is served maZbuuT, which means the amount of sugar will be "just right", about one teaspoon per cup. However, in the Arabian Peninsula, Arabic coffee is roasted in such a way that the coffee is almost clear; it is traditional for the host to refill the guest's cup until politely signaled that the guest is finished.

Coffeehouses have gained popularity in other countries such as Turkey and Iran. Turkey, for example, shares many similarities to Arabic coffeehouses as they integrated into the culture during the Ottoman Empire's reign. On the other hand, Austria's popular Viennese coffeehouses were created with Europe's introduction to coffee. These coffeehouses are dissimilar in that they are not usually places of gathering, instead many people go to sit alone and enjoy coffee. Other variations have been created as the world has modernized: coffeeshops in North America and the Philippines, kopi tiam in Malaysia and Singapore, and cafes in various other countries.

Africa 
Despite originating and 13% of the world's coffee supply being grown in various African countries, coffee culture has just recently emerged. The most explicit sense of a coffee culture is in Northern Africa and Ethiopia. Those who are attempting to create a larger coffee consumption industry in Africa are looking to make it completely dependent on coffee grown in Africa.

Ethiopia 
Drinking Ethiopian coffee, especially in the place of coffee's origin, is a cultural experience. The process for making the coffee, known as Bunna, takes over an hour. First, the beans are washed in water and then placed into a skillet over a fire. Once the beans have burst from their skins, they are ground with a metal stick. The grounds are placed into a jebena, an Ethiopian pot, with hot water and served in a cini cup.

Europe 
The countries of Europe have developed various versions of coffee that have spread across the world. Café au lait and espressos have become norms across in various coffee shops, while the coffee grown in countries formerly colonized by European powers have in turn affected European coffee culture.

France 
French coffee, such as café au lait, has spread across and become popular across the world. However, the method of consuming remains uniquely French. Coffee is drunk sitting down in cafes or relaxing areas. It is also consumed in small amounts, and not for taste or energy. Coffee has been engrained into everyday French culture.

Greece 
Greece has a surprisingly strong and present coffee culture. The , which changes from cafe to bar at night, is mainly for young people under 35 years old to meet and hang out. The kafeneio is where all the old gentlemen used to meet during the popularity "Schools of the Wise". The popular drink of the kafeneio is the ellinikós kafés, which is very similar to Turkish coffee. Its grains are also used for fortune telling after the person finishes drinking. The Greek frappe is a mix of Nescafé, milk, and sugar frothed up and poured over ice. Recent years have seen the rise in popularity of iced espresso-based coffees, such as "espresso freddo" (mixed with ice, then poured over ice) and "cappuccino freddo" (same, but with a layer of cold frothed milk poured on top).

Albania

In 2016, Albania surpassed Spain by becoming the country with the most coffee houses per capita in the world. In fact, there are 654 coffee houses per 100,000 inhabitants in Albania, a country with only 2.5 million inhabitants. This is due to coffee houses closing down in Spain due to the economic crisis, and the fact that as many cafes open as they close in Albania. In addition, the fact that it was one of the easiest ways to make a living after the fall of communism in Albania, together with the country's Ottoman legacy further reinforce the strong dominance of coffee culture in Albania.

Ireland 
Although tea is by far the most popular drink in Ireland, the country has a long history of coffeehouses and its coffee culture has created a drink that has gained worldwide popularity. Irish coffee is a blend of hot coffee, whiskey, and whipped cream. It is usually served after dinner in many Irish establishments.

Italy 

As the birthplace of the espresso machine, Italy places a large emphasis on espresso. One may get their espressos suited to their tastes. The most popular coffee-based beverages are:
 Caffè (espresso)
 Caffè macchiato: espresso with a small amount of milk or milk foam
Cappuccino: espresso with steamed milk foam
 Caffè corretto: espresso with a small amount of an alcoholic beverage, as brandy, sambuca, grappa, or cognac
 Caffellatte (or caffè latte): coffee and milk, usually in a 1:1 proportion
 Latte macchiato: coffee and milk, usually in a 1:2 or 1:3 proportion
 Caffè americano: an espresso with more water

Nordic Countries 
The well-known coffee-break was created in the Nordic region, particularly Sweden and Finland. The fika (pause) tradition calls for two breaks around 10 a.m. and 3 p.m. during the work day. A very social event, fika is usually a coming-together of loved ones, friends, and colleagues over strong coffee and a shared sweet.

Portugal 
As other southern European countries, and as a former colonial power, Portugal has a very deep coffee culture. Coffeehouses can be found in almost every street of every city, town and village, and they are simply called "café" (portuguese for coffee). Going to "the café" or going out to "take a coffee" are linguistic expressions, meaning "going out" or a calm encounter with someone. Like the italian cultural trait, the portuguese equate a "café" to an espresso, the default way to have the drink. Café is usually served after the meals but also at any other time of the day. At portuguese homes, coffee machines or coffee pots are a staple utility. Using mainly robusta beans, Portuguese coffee is made very strong, and the usual order is a Bica (mainly in the Lisbon area), a very bitter shot of espresso. According to a legend, this is an acronym for "Beba Isto Com Açúcar", which translates to "drink this with sugar".

Spain 

The various staples of the coffee life are:
 Café solo: espresso
 Café cortado: espresso with a small amount of milk
 Café con Hielo: iced espresso
 Café Americano: Café solo with more water
 Café caramel/ Café bonbon: espresso/ Café Solo with condensed milk
 Café doble: double espresso
 Café con leche: coffee with milk
 Carajillo: espresso with a small amount of rum, brandy, or whiskey
 Trifasico (Catalan): Carajillo with milk
 Café sombra/ café manchada: a glass of milk with a small amount of coffee 
 Café suizo: coffee with whipped cream

Yugoslavia

Latin America 

Latin America is defined as the territories and countries in the Americas whose main languages are Romantic. A majority of the top-producing coffee countries are in this region, and small, family-owned coffee businesses are still fairly successful. Coffee, especially with the combination of European and indigenous cultures, is extremely popular and unique to each region.

Mexico 
The most popular form of coffee in Mexico is café de olla. Its name derives from how the coffee is made in a clay pot. Traditionally, piloncillo, unrefined brown sugar, and a cinnamon stick is served with the dark roast coffee made in the pot.

Brazil 
Coffee's extreme popularity in Brazil reaches all ages and demographics. One of the most popular drinks of the country is café com leite, which is extreme strong coffee blended with a large amount of milk. This drink is usually served at breakfast to adults and children alike. Another popular Brazilian drink is the cafezinho, made with a strong coffee blend similar to that used in café com leite and a large portion of sugar.

Ecuador 
Coffee in Ecuador is often pre-sweetened and made using instant coffee. When one orders a café con leche, they receive a large glass of steamed milk with a small pile of instant coffee. In order to request coffee made in the traditional sense, the correct way to order is to request a café filtrado.

Cuba 
Much like in Brazil, coffee is best enjoyed within the family in Cuba. Cuban coffee is usually a coffee ration mixed with a store-bought coffee blend. It is usually made very strong, but sweet. One popular form is the café cubano, or the cafecito, which is an espresso made with sugar. A less sweet version is the cortadito, an espresso with steamed milk.

North America 
Although Canada consumes more coffee than the United States, the populations of both countries enjoy quick, fast, and sugary consumptions of coffee. Both are dominated by coffee chains (e.g. Tim Horton's and Starbucks), yet have different coffee cultures from region to region. For example, the Northeastern U.S. mostly wants fast coffee (e.g. Dunkin Donuts "Everybody runs on Dunkin" slogan). While places like Portland, OR and San Francisco, CA have developed a more hipster-esque style café-roaster coffee culture.

East Asia 
Coffee culture is a relatively new, yet large phenomenon in East Asia. Coffee shops, both Starbucks and smaller businesses, have been growing exponentially in urban areas. The most popular coffee shops are those in which tradition has blended with the new surge of coffee culture.

Japan 
Japanese coffee culture has been able to blend that of North American coffee culture and Japanese tea culture. While the country does have its fast coffee pickups in the major cities, it is also developing coffee shops similar to those of traditional tea shops. These coffee shops are very trendy, with latte designs and popular Japanese culture; however, they also try to preserve the politeness and methods of old Japanese tea serving.

Korea

Southeast Asia 
Kopitiam is a traditional Southeast Asian coffeehouse, and is most popular in Singapore and Malaysia. All generations hang out at kopitiams, while drinking strong green tea and coffee with milk in their traditional forms. While these exist in almost every neighborhood, more modern versions of coffee are spreading across major cities and coffee centers.

While urban areas have adopted the trend of nano- and micro-roasters, coffee growing cities (e.g. Bangkok and Jakarta) have created their own speciality blends that are sold in local speciality coffee shops. Indonesia in particular is one of the world's leading producers of coffee, and one of the product's leading exporters.

Vietnam 

As the French brought coffee to Vietnam, it bears its influence heavily. Similarly, coffee is a large part of both cultures. For example, the Vietnamese take their coffee very seriously, only importing the best roasts and blends. However, when referring to Vietnamese coffee, words like "success" and "discover" are used. The most popular coffee drink in Vietnam is ca phe sua da, or "coffee, milk, ice". This drink is created by mixing strong coffee poured through a water drip and sweetened condensed milk, and then pouring that over ice.

India
Coffee was first smuggled into India in the 16th century and has been grown in the states of Karnataka, Kerala and Tamil Nadu ever since. While tea is the preferred beverage of most Indians, coffee found a foothold among families in southern India. The morning ritual of South Indian filter coffee brewing flourishes in these states, with families procuring small lots of plantation coffee beans ground from neighborhood stores and preparing strong concoctions by pouring hot water over powder lined in a filter. This is mixed with sweetened milk and served in a steel tumbler and dabarah saucer, a set of containers used to cool the beverage. The addition of chicory, a practice encouraged by the Coffee Board during World War II as a means of rationing supply, has now become tradition. The Coffee Board also started the Indian Coffee House chain during the 1940s which became a hub for socio-political movements in major cities through the decades after independence. In the 1990s, the Indian cafe chain Cafe Coffee Day ushered in an era of social interactions over coffee, introducing a new generation to the beverage with their slogan "A Lot Can Happen Over Coffee". Since then, international chains like Starbucks, along with a slew of artisanal coffee roasters, have further driven consumption in urban India.

Oceania

Australia and New Zealand

References 

Coffee culture